Geophilus oweni is a species of soil centipede in the family Geophilidae found in Missouri, Indiana, and Ohio. It grows up to 40 millimeters in length, has 67-73 leg pairs in males and 71-77 in females, and varies from bright to faded yellow in color. G. oweni can be identified by its numerous leg pairs, lack of consolidated sacculi, prelabral consolidated areas, and long, thin second maxillary apical claws. G. missouriensis (Chamberlin, 1928) was found to be synonymous with G. oweni.

References 

oweni
Arthropods of North America
Animals described in 1887
Taxa named by Henry Wilfred Brolemann